Werner Wettersten (19 April 1923 - 15 August 2009) was a Swedish sprint canoeist who competed from the late 1940s to the late 1950s. At the 1948 Summer Olympics in London, he finished sixth both in the C-2 1000 m and C-2 10000 m events. Eight years later, Wettersten also finished sixth both in the C-1 1000 m and C-1 10000 m events.

References
Sports-reference.com profile
Werner Wettersten (Swedish)

1923 births
Canoeists at the 1948 Summer Olympics
Canoeists at the 1956 Summer Olympics
Olympic canoeists of Sweden
2009 deaths
Swedish male canoeists